Thomas Bradford Gilles (born July 2, 1962) is an American former professional baseball pitcher. Gilles pitched in two games for the Toronto Blue Jays of Major League Baseball (MLB) in the  season.

Born in Peoria, Illinois, he was drafted by the New York Yankees in the 47th round of the 1984 amateur draft.

External links
 , or Retrosheet
Pelota Binaria (Venezuelan Winter League)

1962 births
Living people
American expatriate baseball players in Canada
Appleton Foxes players
Baseball players from Illinois
Cardenales de Lara players
American expatriate baseball players in Venezuela
Duluth-Superior Dukes players
Fort Lauderdale Yankees players
Gulf Coast Yankees players
Indiana State Sycamores baseball players
Kenosha Twins players
Knoxville Blue Jays players
Major League Baseball pitchers
Oneonta Yankees players
Orlando Twins players
Reno Silver Sox players
Sportspeople from Peoria, Illinois
Syracuse Chiefs players
Toronto Blue Jays players